"Evil", sometimes listed as "Evil (Is Going On)", is a Chicago blues song written by Willie Dixon. Howlin' Wolf recorded the song in Chicago for Chess Records in 1954. It was included on the 1959 compilation album Moanin' in the Moonlight.  When he re-recorded it for The Howlin' Wolf Album in 1969, "Evil" became Wolf's last charting single, reaching number 43 Billboard R&B chart.

Howlin' Wolf first recorded the song at Chess' studio in Chicago on May 25, 1954, with sidemen Hubert Sumlin and Jody Williams on guitars, Otis Spann on piano, Willie Dixon on double-bass, and Earl Phillips on drums.   Wolf achieves a coarse, emotional performance with his strained singing, lapsing into falsetto. The song, a twelve-bar blues, is punctuated with a syncopated backbeat, brief instrumental improvisations, upper-end piano figures, and intermittent blues harp provided by Wolf. The lyrics caution about the "evil" that takes place in a man's home when he is away, concluding with "you better watch your happy home".

References

1954 songs
Songs written by Willie Dixon
Blues songs
1954 singles
Howlin' Wolf songs
Monster Magnet songs
Chess Records singles
1969 singles